Wendy Abrams (born 1965) is an American environmentalist. She is founder of Cool Globes. In 2010 she was designated a Women's History Month Honoree by the National Women's History Project.

Early life and education 
Abrams grew up Wendy Mills in Highland Park. She received a bachelor's degree from Brown University (1987) and an MBA from the Kellogg Graduate School of Management.

Career
In 2006, Wendy Abrams founded Cool Globes, Inc., a non-profit organization dedicated to raising awareness of climate change through public art and education. The first exhibit, "Cool Globes: Hot Ideas for a Cooler Planet" premiered in Chicago in 2007 and since then the exhibition has been in 22 cities and translated into nine languages- from Arabic to Spanish.

Abrams serves on the Leadership Council for Robert F. Kennedy Human Rights and is a 2019 Ripple of Hope laureate, along with U.S. House Speaker Nancy Pelosi, and J. K. Rowling, among others.

In 2011, she helped establish The Abrams Environmental Law Clinic at the University of Chicago Law School. It was the first step of the Edwin F. Mandel Legal Aid Clinic expansion which intends to guarantee clinical experience to all law students.

Politics
Abrams expressed a hope that President Obama would initiate divestment from oil. Abrams was a substantive critic of the Keystone Pipeline and urged voters to oppose it, claiming that it would impact American energy independence. Abrams is a major donor to Hillary Clinton, Barack Obama and Rahm Emanuel.

Personal life
She is married to Jim Abrams; they have four children. They live in Highland Park, Illinois.

References

External links
Cool Globes website

American women environmentalists
1965 births
Brown University alumni
Kellogg School of Management alumni
People from Highland Park, Illinois
Living people
21st-century American women